Final Battle (2018) was a professional wrestling pay-per-view (PPV) event produced by Ring of Honor (ROH). The four-hour long event took place on December 14, 2018, at the Hammerstein Ballroom in New York City, New York. It was the 17th event under the Final Battle chronology.

Storylines
Final Battle 2018 features professional wrestling matches, which involve different wrestlers from pre-existing scripted feuds, plots, and storylines that play out on ROH's television programs. Wrestlers portray villains or heroes as they follow a series of events that build tension and culminate in a wrestling match or series of matches.

Event 

The pay-per-view opened with Eli Isom faced Kenny King. Isom performed a gory bomb for a near-fall. In the end, King performed the Royal Flush to win the match.

Next, Jeff Cobb defended the ROH World Television Championship against Adam Page. Page performed a fallaway slam on Cobb. Page countered Cobb's finisher Tour of the Islands into a crucifix for a near-fall. In the end, Cobb performed couple of Tour of the Islands to retain the title.

After that, Sumie Sakai defended the Women of Honor World Championship in a Four Corner Survival match against Kelly Klein, Madison Rayne and Karen Q. Mandy Leon joined to the commentary for this match. Klein eliminated Q after she performed the K-Power. Sakai performed the Smash Mouth on Rayne, and Klein pinned Rayne. In the end, Klein performed an avalanche K-Power to win the title for the first time. Klein and Sakai hugged after the match.

Later, Zack Sabre Jr. made his ROH debut as he faced Jonathan Gresham. During the match, both wrestlers traded submission holds. In the end, Gresham went for a springboard moonsault, but Sabre countered it into a European Clutch to win the match.

Next, Matt Taven (accompanied by T. K. O'Ryan) faced Dalton Castle (accompanied by The Boys). During the match, Taven went for a suicide dive, however, when Castle moved away, Taven landed on the steel barricade. In the end, Taven avoided Castle's finisher and performed the Climax to win the match.

After that, Christopher Daniels faced Marty Scurll in a singles match for Scurll's number one contender spot to the ROH World Championship. Daniels performed a Burning Hammer for a near-fall. Daniels performed a Tombstone Piledriver for a near-fall. Scrull countered Daniels's finisher Best Moonsault Ever by raising his knees. In the climax, Scurll forced Daniels to submit to the crossface chickenwing to win the match.

Later, as Daniels posed on the second ropes as the crowd cheered for him, Bully Ray came into the ring and attacked him with a low blow. Ray called out Flip Gordon for their "I Quit" match. Gordon came to the match with the American flag. Ray grabbed Gordon's girlfriend who sat in the front row, and threatened to powerbomb her through a table in an attempt to make Gordon quit. Cary Silkin attacked Ray with a kendo stick, and as Ray was distracted, Gordon's girlfriend low blowed him. Silas Young attacked Gordon, and fought Colt Cabana and Cheeseburger who came to the aid of Gordon. In the climax, the lights went off and on, and the ECW legend The Sandman stood in the ring. He attacked Young with a kendo stick, and later handed it to Gordon, who hit Ray with it multiple times and forced him to quit.

In the penultimate match, Jay Lethal defended the ROH World Championship against Cody (accompanied by Brandi Rhodes). Before the match begun, Cody did a promo where he insulted the crowd. Lethal accidentally almost kicked the referee, Brandi used this opportunity and speared Lethal, and Cody pinned him for a near-fall. Brandi accidentally speared Cody and received the Lethal Injection from Lethal. Cody performed the Cross Rhodes for a near-fall. Cody locked a figure-four leglock and thought that he won, although Lethal never tapped. In the end, Lethal forced Cody to submit to a figure-four leglock of his own to retain the title. After the match, Scrull entered the ring and went face to face with Lethal, as the NWA World Heavyweight Champion Nick Aldis (accompanied by Camille), applauded from the ramp.

Main event 
In the main event, SoCal Uncensored (Frankie Kazarian and Scorpio Sky) defended the ROH World Tag Team Championship against The Briscoes (Jay Briscoe and Mark Briscoe) and The Young Bucks (Matt Jackson and Nick Jackson) in Ladder War IX. Jay pushed Nick from a ladder into a table. In the climax, Jay pulled the belts and The Briscoes won the titles for the tenth time.

Results

Four Corner Survival match

See also
2018 in professional wrestling
List of Ring of Honor pay-per-view events

Notes

References

External links
Ring of Honor's official website

2018 in sports in New York City
Events in New York City
2018
Professional wrestling in New York City
December 2018 events in the United States
2018 Ring of Honor pay-per-view events